Gary Boddington (born 1 May 1967) is a South African former field hockey player who competed in the 1996 Summer Olympics.

Boddington spent over 12 years building South Africa-based business intelligence firm Alchemex and managing its eventual acquisition by the Sage Group. Most recently Boddington was EVP and General Manager of the Sage Business Intelligence business unit.

Boddington is the founder & president of Silver Lining Ventures based in Vancouver, British Columbia, Canada. He is also advisor to multiple startups such as Mentio, FreshBI, and VersAccounts.

References

External links

1967 births
South African people of British descent
Living people
South African male field hockey players
Olympic field hockey players of South Africa
Field hockey players at the 1996 Summer Olympics
20th-century South African people